is a subway station on the Tokyo Metro Tozai Line in Kiba, Kōtō, Tokyo, Japan, operated by Tokyo Metro. It is numbered T-13.

Lines

Station layout

The station has a single underground island platform on the 4th basement level, serving two tracks.

Platforms

History
Kiba Station opened on 14 September 1967. It was the first Tokyo Metro station to be built by shield tunneling.

The station facilities were inherited by Tokyo Metro after the privatization of the Teito Rapid Transit Authority (TRTA) in 2004.

Passenger statistics
In fiscal 2000, the station was used by an average of 54,071 passengers daily.

Surrounding area

 Museum of Contemporary Art Tokyo
 Kiba Park
 Fukagawa Police Station
 Fukagawa Fire Station
 Heikyu Elementary School
 Toei Ōedo Line Kiba Rolling Stock Maintenance Depot

References

External links

 Kiba Station information (Tokyo Metro) 

Railway stations in Japan opened in 1967
Tokyo Metro Tozai Line
Stations of Tokyo Metro
Railway stations in Tokyo